(born October 3, 1987) is a Japanese Olympic and Nation Record holding swimmer. She swam for Japan at the 2008 Olympics.

Major achievements
2006 Doha Asian Games
 50m breaststroke 2nd (32.27)
 100m breaststroke 1st (1:09.13)
 200m breaststroke 4th (2:28.81)
 200m individual medley 2nd (2:14.51)
 4 × 100 m medley relay 2nd (4:05.14)
2008 Beijing Olympics
 100m breaststroke 8th (Heat 1:08.36, Semifinal 1:08.23, Final 1:08.43)
 200m individual medley 6th (Heat 2:12.47 JR, Semifinal 2:12.02 JR, Final 2:11.56 JR)
 4 × 100 m freestyle relay 9th (Heat 3:39.25 JR)
 4 × 100 m medley relay 6th (Heat 3:59.91, Final 3:59.54 JR)
JR: Japanese Record

Personal bests
In long course
 100m breaststroke: 1:08.23 (August 11, 2008)
 200m individual medley: 2:11.44 Japanese Record (September 6, 2008)

In short course
 100m breaststroke: 1:05.17 Asian, Japanese Record (February 21, 2009)
 100m individual medley: 1:00.01 Japanese Record (February 21, 2009)
 200m individual medley: 2:08.77 Asian, Japanese Record (February 22, 2009)

References
 http://www.joc.or.jp/beijing/athlete/aquatics/kitagawaasami.html

1987 births
Living people
Olympic swimmers of Japan
Japanese female medley swimmers
Swimmers at the 2008 Summer Olympics
Sportspeople from Saitama (city)
Asian Games medalists in swimming
Swimmers at the 2006 Asian Games
Japanese female breaststroke swimmers
Universiade medalists in swimming
Asian Games gold medalists for Japan
Asian Games silver medalists for Japan
Medalists at the 2006 Asian Games
Universiade silver medalists for Japan
Medalists at the 2009 Summer Universiade
21st-century Japanese women